University of Boumerdes, or M’Hamed Bougara University of Boumerdés, abbreviated as  is a university located in the center of Algeria in the Boumerdès Province. It was established in 1998.

Faculty and Institutes 
 University of Boumerdès Faculty of Sciences
 University of Boumerdes Faculty of Technology 
 University of Boumerdès Faculty of Hydrocarbons and Chemistry
 University of Boumerdès Faculty of Economic and Commercial Sciences
 University of Boumerdès Faculty of Rights
 University of Boumerdès Institute of Electrical and Electronic Engineering

See also 
 List of universities in Algeria

References

External links
 Official website 

1998 establishments in Algeria
Boumerdès
Buildings and structures in Boumerdès Province